Spatalistis crocomis is a species of moth of the family Tortricidae. It is found in India.

The wingspan is about 16 mm. The forewings are rather dark fuscous with an elongate-trapezoidal yellow patch extending along the costa, broadest posteriorly, the costal edge dark fuscous at the base. There is a subtriangular yellow spot on the dorsum, reaching half across the wing. The hindwings are 
grey.

References

Moths described in 1908
crocomis
Moths of Asia
Taxa named by Edward Meyrick